Liu Gongquan, courtesy name Chengxuan, was a Chinese calligrapher, essayist, and politician who lived during the late Tang dynasty. Liu Gongquan was especially famous for regular script and was one of the 4 calligraphic masters of regular script in China. The other three were Yan Zhenqing, Ouyang Xun and Zhao Mengfu.

Style 
A minister like Yan of the Tang dynasty, Liu was a native of today's Tongchuan, Shaanxi, a devout Buddhist and follower of Yan's style of writing.  Like him an expert of the regular script, Liu's works were imitated for centuries after and he is often referred in unison with his famed predecessor as "Yan-Liu".

Calligraphy
Xuan mi ta bei from the Forest of Steles in Xian.

References
Wang, Jingfen, "Liu Gongquan". Encyclopedia of China (Arts Edition), 1st ed.

External links
    
Liu Gongquan and his Calligraphy Gallery at China Online Museum

778 births
865 deaths
9th-century Chinese calligraphers
Artists from Shaanxi
Politicians from Tongchuan
Tang dynasty calligraphers
Tang dynasty essayists
Tang dynasty politicians from Shaanxi
Writers from Tongchuan